Revenge of the Nerds III: The Next Generation is a 1992 American made-for-television comedy film and a sequel to the 1984 hit comedy film Revenge of the Nerds, produced by Robert Engelman, directed by Roland Mesa, that stars Robert Carradine, Curtis Armstrong, Ted McGinley, Julia Montgomery, and Morton Downey Jr. It is the third installment in the Revenge of the Nerds series. The subtitle is a reference to the TV series Star Trek: The Next Generation, which was then at the height of its popularity.

Plot
A new generation of nerd students now rule on campus at Adams College. The Alpha Betas are respectful of the nerds' prominence. Everything changes when a successful but reprehensible businessman, Orrin Price, becomes a member of the Adams College Board of Regents. A new generation of jocks has also come to Adams, including Orrin's nerd-hating son. Former Alpha Beta Stan Gable, now a motorcycle police officer, is installed as the new Dean of Students by Orrin Price.

Lewis, who chairs Adams' Computer Science Department, has been distancing himself from his nerd past by growing a ponytail and asking people to call him "Lew" rather than Lewis. His nephew Harold, now a student at Adams, is surprised at his uncle's behavior, pointing out that in his day Lewis was the "George Washington of nerds". Betty, now married to Lewis and also an art professor at Adams College, tries to remind him that she fell in love with him because he had the courage to be himself. But Lewis is more interested in becoming friends with the new dean, not noticing that Stan Gable hopes to break up his marriage and win back Betty. Meanwhile, Harold and his friend pledge Lambda Lambda Lambda, whose group now includes an obese kilt-wearing English inductee and a Korean Elvis impersonator, who emphasizes that he is South Korean when asked about his dixie accent. Harold successfully makes it through the Tri-Lamb's "rush week". However, a barbeque celebrating the new members is disrupted by Alpha Betas in ski masks. More harassment comes, and the Tri-Lambs look for legal help, but have a hard time finding a suitable alumni due to most of them getting technical jobs. However, one alumni is an attorney, Dudley "Booger" Dawson. Booger warns Lewis about the harassment, but leaves in disgust when he sees Betty and Lewis socializing with Stan, calling Lewis a "self hater".

Lewis reaches out to Stan to help defend the Tri-Lambs, but Stan says no. Lewis angrily reminds Stan that he was forgiving of their rocky past and even defended him when others were telling him Stan was worthless. But Stan says that he is not Lewis' friend and that Lewis will always be a nerd. This betrayal spurs Lewis to once again embrace his nerd self. He arranges bail for the arrested Tri-Lambs by putting up his house as collateral. He then calls upon all nerds, those on campus and in the city, who are sympathetic to their cause to participate in a massive nerd strike. Many of the city's basic utilities and services become crippled. To end the strike, Price frames Lewis for embezzling college funds and harvesting marijuana in the basement of the Tri-Lamb house. Stan thinks Orrin Price has gone too far, yet does not object to Price's actions. The strike is called off after Lewis is arrested. Betty confronts Stan about getting Lewis released, even offering herself to sleep with him. Stan becomes deeply ashamed and declines her offer.

Many of Lewis' old Tri-Lamb friends as well as his father return to support him. At the trial, the judge denies all of Booger's arguments and says that Lewis is guilty. Stan has a change of heart and testifies against Price, admitting that he has proof that Price framed Lewis for the theft and also planted the marijuana. Stan also admits that he is a nerd and has always wanted to read books and learn as much as possible, but his family always discouraged it. Price is arrested, and the charges against Lewis are dismissed. The Tri-Lambs are cleared, and the Alpha Betas are defeated once again, this time losing their Adams fraternity charter. Stan feels it best that he resign as dean of students, but Lewis convinces Stan to stay on. The nerds accept Stan as one of their own, once again guaranteeing nerd freedom at Adams College.

Cast
This film features a new generation of nerds in the Lambda Lambda Lambda fraternity and also marks the return of several other characters from the first two films.

 Robert Carradine as Lewis "Lew" Skolnick 
 Ted McGinley as Stanley Harvey "Stan" Gable
 Curtis Armstrong as Dudley "Booger" Dawson
 Julia Montgomery as Betty Childs Skolnick
 Morton Downey, Jr. as Orrin Price
 Gregg Binkley as Harold Skolnick
 Jennifer Bassey as Ruth
 Richard Israel as Ira Poppus
 Henry Cho as Steve Toyota
 Bernie Casey as U. N. Jefferson
 James Cromwell as Mr. Skolnick 
 Mark Clayman as Bobo Peterson
 Mike Greenwood as Gilbert Lowe 
 Laurel Moglen as Judy
 Larry B. Scott as Lamar Latrelle 
 Sean Whalen as Harold Wormser 
 Brian Tochi as Takashi Toshiro
 John Pinette as Trevor Gulf
 Chi McBride as Malcolm Pennington III (as Chi) 
 Grant Heslov as Mason

Production

Casting
Anthony Edwards was unavailable for his role of Gilbert Lowe, Lewis's best friend. Gilbert appears in the film, played by Mike Greenwood, while Sean Whalen plays the role of Wormser, replacing Andrew Cassese. Alan Wittert takes the role of Dean Ulich, replacing David Wohl. The Poindexter character was written out of the series due to actor Timothy Busfield choosing not to participate in the film.

Reception
In Variety, critic Carole Kucharewicz summarized that "although the concept is no longer fresh, it provides some hearty, though rather far between, laughs. 'Nerd' devotees will stick it through to the end although the uninitiated may not get past the first hour; or they may not just get it." She was pleased that despite the film's subtitle, it was chiefly focused on the same themes and characters that made the first film in the series so enjoyable. She said that while many of the sight gags and the performances of Armstrong, Carradine, and Cho were genuinely hilarious, the script became bogged down in flat material for long stretches. Entertainment Weeklys brief review gave the film a C, remarking that "There are a few chuckles in Revenge of the Nerds III: The Next Generation, but the sustained merriment of the original is long gone."

Home media
 
The film was released on DVD both as part of the Atomic Wedgie Collection and separately.

References

External links

1990s sex comedy films
1992 comedy films
1992 films
1992 television films
20th Century Fox Television films
American sex comedy films
Films about fraternities and sororities
Films about school bullying
Fox network original films
Revenge Of The Nerds 3
Television sequel films
1990s American films